The KiSS1-derived peptide receptor (also known as GPR54 or the Kisspeptin receptor) is a G protein-coupled receptor which binds the peptide hormone kisspeptin (metastin). Kisspeptin is encoded by the metastasis suppressor gene KISS1, which is expressed in a variety of endocrine and gonadal tissues. Activation of the kisspeptin receptor is linked to the phospholipase C and inositol trisphosphate second messenger cascades inside the cell.

Function 
Kisspeptin is involved in the regulation of endocrine function and the onset of puberty, with activation of the kisspeptin receptor triggering release of gonadotropin-releasing hormone (GnRH), and release of kisspeptin itself being inhibited by oestradiol but enhanced by GnRH. Reductions in kisspeptin levels with age may conversely be one of the reasons behind age-related declines in levels of other endocrine hormones such as luteinizing hormone.

Ligands
No non-peptide ligands for this receptor have yet been discovered, but as of 2009 both selective agonist and antagonist peptides are known.

Agonists
 Kisspeptin (kisspeptin-54, metastin)
 Kisspeptin-10 (112-121 C-terminal fragment)
 KISS1-305
 MVT-602 (RVT-602, TAK-448)
 TAK-683

Antagonists
 Kisspeptin-10 analogues modified with amino substitutions
 Kisspeptin-234

References

Further reading

External links 
 
 

G protein-coupled receptors